Cytokinesis in terrestrial plants occurs by cell plate formation. This process entails the delivery of Golgi-derived and endosomal vesicles carrying cell wall and cell membrane components to the plane of cell division and the subsequent fusion of these vesicles within this plate.

After formation of an early tubulo-vesicular network at the center of the cell, the initially labile cell plate consolidates into a tubular network and eventually a fenestrated sheet. The cell plate grows outward from the center of the cell to the parental plasma membrane with which it will fuse, thus completing cell division. Formation and growth of the cell plate is dependent upon the phragmoplast, which is required for proper targeting of Golgi-derived vesicles to the cell plate. 

As the cell plate matures in the central part of the cell, the phragmoplast disassembles in this region and new elements are added on its outside. This process leads to a steady expansion of the phragmoplast and, concomitantly, to a continuous retargeting of Golgi-derived vesicles to the growing edge of the cell plate. Once the cell plate reaches and fuses with the plasma membrane the phragmoplast disappears. This event not only marks the separation of the two daughter cells, but also initiates a range of biochemical modifications that transform the callose-rich, flexible cell plate into a cellulose-rich, stiff primary cell wall. 

The heavy dependence of cell plate formation on active Golgi stacks explains why plant cells, unlike animal cells, do not disassemble their secretion machinery during cell division. 

Cell cycle
Mitosis
Plant cells